The Electoral Act 1923 was a law in Ireland which established the electoral law of the Irish Free State and provided for parliamentary constituencies in Dáil Éireann.

Franchise
Article 14 of the Constitution of the Irish Free State adopted on 6 December 1922 provided equal suffrage to men and women over the age of twenty-one. This was provided in the Electoral Act 1923. Equal suffrage on the basis of sex would not become law in the United Kingdom until 1928. It also abolished plural voting: electors could be registered in only one constituency: the constituency in which he or she was ordinarily resident; the constituency in which he or she occupied business premises; or one of two university constituencies.

Repeal
It was substantially replaced as the principal electoral legislation by the Electoral Act 1963. Its remaining provisions were repealed by a further revision and consolidation of electoral law in the Electoral Act 1992.

Constituencies
This Act replaced the constituencies defined in the Government of Ireland Act 1920, which had been in use at the 1921 election and the 1922 election. It also increased the number of seats in the Dáil by 25 from 128 to 153. These constituencies were first used at the 1923 election held on 27 August for the 4th Dáil.

The constituencies in the 1923 Act were in turn replaced by the Electoral (Revision of Constituencies) Act 1935, which came into effect on the dissolution of the 8th Dáil, and were first in use at the 1937 general election held on 14 June for the 9th Dáil. The two university constituencies were abolished at the same election by separate legislation.

See also
History of the franchise in Ireland
Elections in the Republic of Ireland

References

Electoral 1923
1923 in Irish law
Acts of the Oireachtas of the 1920s